Folch may refer to:

People
Albert Folch Folch, Catalan scientist, writer, and artist
Anna Sophia Folch (born 1985), Brazilian actress
Fernando Ramon Folch, 2nd Duke of Cardona, (1470–1543), Spanish noble, 2nd Duke of Cardona and Viceroy of Sicily
Folch solution, a solution containing chloroform and methanol
Jordi Folch Pi, a Catalan biochemist at Harvard University (McLean Hospital)
José Solís Folch de Cardona, (1716–1770), Spanish colonial administrator and viceroy of New Granada
Juan Ramón Folch de Cardona y Ximenez de Arenós, (1418–1485), 4th Count of Cardona, Viceroy of Sicily
Maikel Folch (born 1980), left-handed pitcher for the Cuban national baseball team
Ramon Folch i Guillèn (born 1946), Catalan socio-ecologist
Ramón Folch Frigola (born 1989), Catalan footballer
Sancho Folch de Cardona, 1st Marquess of Guadalest, heir son of Alfonso Folch de Cardona y Fajardo

Other
The Folch Mineral Collection (Barcelona, Spain), one of the best mineral collections in Europe

Catalan-language surnames